Noboru Nakamura may refer to:

 Noboru Nakamura (1913–1981), Japanese film director
 Noboru Nakamura (designer), Japanese designer responsible for the IKEA Poäng chair